Lafayette County School District is a school district in Lafayette County, Arkansas. It administers an elementary school and a high school. It offers education for students from Pre-K through 12th grade.

It was established on July 1, 2003, when the Lewisville School District consolidated with the Stamps School District.

In addition to Lafayette County it also serves a section of Miller County, which houses Garland.

Schools 

Lafayette County Elementary School
Lafayette County High School

References

Further reading
Maps of the predecessor districts
  (Download)
  (Download)

External links
 

School districts in Arkansas
Education in Lafayette County, Arkansas
Education in Miller County, Arkansas
2003 establishments in Arkansas
School districts established in 2003